Northland is an affluent suburb in west-central Wellington, New Zealand. Not far from Victoria University it also includes low-priced accommodation popular with young students. It borders the suburbs of Highbury, Kelburn, Thorndon, Wilton, Wadestown and Karori. Northland is populated by a mix of university students, young professionals and families. Part of the area was known as Creswick until the late 19th century when new roads and building sites were developed by the landowner, C J Pharazyn, who marketed the whole area as Northland. At that time it was described in The Evening Post (now part of The Dominion Post) as "Wellington's best suburb".

Location 
Northland lies to the west of Kelburn separated by a steep gully. It is east of Karori, to the north of Highbury, some distance through The Town Belt to the south-west of Wadestown, and to the south of Wilton. It sits high on the south western slopes of Te Ahumairangi by the Wellington Botanic Garden, Zealandia Wildlife Sanctuary and, on the fill over the piped Kaiwharawhara Stream, Ian Galloway Park with its Rugby fields and dog exercise area.

Notable buildings 
There is a cluster of shops at the top of Garden Road and just below Creswick Terrace known as the Creswick Shops. Woburn Road has the Northland Memorial Community Centre.

Heritage buildings
 Northland Fire Station, 54–56 Northland Road.
 The two church buildings at 69 and 77 Northland Road detailed below
 92 Northland Road
 82 Creswick Terrace
 Farm Road houses. Numbers 5, 10, 11 and 13
 The two tunnels

Churches
Churches in Northland include:
 Old St Anne's Anglican church building at 77 Northland Road built about 1905 is listed as a Historic Place category 2.
The building currently known as St Anne's was formerly—
 Ward Memorial Methodist church at 69 Northland Road built 1929.
 Church of St Vincent de Paul, The Rigi

Educations
Northland is served by two state primary schools.

It was moved up from Thorndon. Cardinal McKeefry Catholic attracts pupils from a very wide collection zone throughout Wellington's central and western suburbs.

Both these schools are co-educational. Rolls are as of

Notable residents
Harbour View Road
 Prime Ministers Michael Joseph Savage and after him Peter Fraser lived in a house bought in 1939 for the purpose at 64–66 Harbour View Road. Following the 1949 general election, Sidney Holland chose to live nearer parliament at 41 Pipitea Street, Thorndon.
 Potter Doreen Blumhardt  lived in Harbour View Road from 1955 until her death in 2009. Her first house at number 35  was 65 steps down from the road, followed by a further 40 steps down to her work shed and kiln. It was designed for her by Anthony Treadwell and built in 1955. She bought number 70, directly above 35, in 1979 for its drive-on access and lived there from 1986 until her death.

Northland Road
 Author Iris Wilkinson (Robin Hyde) lived at 92 Northland Rd from 1919–1928.

Farm Road
 Poet and educator, Harvey McQueen and his wife Anne Else lived at 13 Farm Road.

National Poetry Collection
The National Poetry Collection is kept in Woburn Road.

History

Orangikaupapa
The Orangikaupapa Block (or Orangi-Kaupapa) on the hill directly opposite the main entrance to the Botanical Gardens was a small Ngāti Awa village where there was "considerable settlement". Population in the 1886 census: 53 males and 48 females. In the 1892 census it had doubled to 110 males and 102 females It was also known as Cliff Pa. In the early 20th century the hill was known for a time as Wireless Hill and is now Te Ahumairangi.

Near the top of the road there were 80 acres of potato gardens belonging to Te Matehou of Pipitea.

Creswick
The township of Creswick in Karori riding of Hutt County was surveyed and subdivided and more than a hundred allotments offered for sale in August 1878. The sections varied in size between quarter of an acre and three acres. Population in the 1886 census: 58 males and 30 females, 1892: 47 males and 35 females. The name Creswick stuck to the area between Randwick Road and what was the Kaiwharawhara Stream and is now Curtis Street for some years. A further fifty-one sites were sold in March 1895

Governor's Farm
The area on the Glenmore Street side had the name Governor's farm because for some years in the 19th century the owner, C. J. Pharazyn, leased it to Government House when that was in Thorndon on The Beehive's site. Government House used it for a kind of home farm with vegetable gardens (Garden Road) dairy cows and grazing for horses. The building known as Governor's farmhouse was on what is now Seaview Terrace where it joins the military road. The kink in Glenmore Street at its junction with Garden Road was known as Governor's Bend.

Gold
An "auriferous alluvial deposit" was found on a low spur running east west on the Governor's Farm a few hundred yards from the Botanical Gardens while Mr Bidmead was burying a dead cow in 1888.

Northland
The new western suburb of Wellington, the new township of Northland, was subdivided and put on sale on 9 March 1900 on the instructions of C. J. Pharazyn.

It was named by him in honour of Thomas Uchter Caulfield, Viscount Northland (1882–1915), the eldest son of the Earl of Ranfurly, Governor of New Zealand from 1897 to 1904. Viscount Northland was a subsidiary title of the Earl's, borne by his eldest son as a courtesy.

On 1 April 1908 Northland left the Borough of Karori following a declaration by the Minister of Internal Affairs that the Kaiwarra Stream (Kaiwharawhara Stream) would be the boundary between Karori and the city of Wellington.

Tunnels
The Karori Tunnel. A new road was built in 1898 from Wellington to Karori including a tunnel beneath Baker's Hill. If built as a cutting it would have created 140 foot high slopes on each side with a high risk of slips. The tunnel also left Raroa Crescent, the existing Te Aro — Karori road, undisturbed

The Northland Tunnel. Major earthworks were required to build ramps to link the tunnel's Northland Road, Raroa Road now Crescent and Karori Road now known as Chaytor Street at a gradient suitable for trams. Tunnelling found greasy and treacherous ground requiring double shifts on the tunnelling to complete lining and stabilising as quickly as possible. In view of the public's unease for the safety of the workmen an expert tunneller, a Mr Robert Semple, was called in to inspect the site. The stability of the tunnel remained in doubt. Expensive remedial work was finished in January 1928. A bus service was provided because the roadway on the Northland side had yet to be widened and reinforced to take the weight of the trams. There were lengthy courtroom battles between Council and affected residents which had to be settled before that work could be carried out. The tunnel was opened to trams on 4 June 1929.

The Karori Tunnel was 250 feet long, the Northland Tunnel, 225 feet. For comparison the Kilbirnie (Mt Victoria bus) Tunnel is 1,274 feet and Seatoun 470 feet.

Demographics 

Northland (Wellington City) had a population of 3,552 at the 2018 New Zealand census, an increase of 195 people (5.8%) since the 2013 census, and an increase of 291 people (8.9%) since the 2006 census. There were 1,317 households. There were 1,740 males and 1,812 females, giving a sex ratio of 0.96 males per female. The median age was 31.8 years (compared with 37.4 years nationally), with 579 people (16.3%) aged under 15 years, 1,098 (30.9%) aged 15 to 29, 1,608 (45.3%) aged 30 to 64, and 270 (7.6%) aged 65 or older.

Ethnicities were 88.1% European/Pākehā, 6.3% Māori, 2.3% Pacific peoples, 9.3% Asian, and 2.2% other ethnicities (totals add to more than 100% since people could identify with multiple ethnicities).

The proportion of people born overseas was 27.9%, compared with 27.1% nationally.

Although some people objected to giving their religion, 64.8% had no religion, 24.1% were Christian, 1.1% were Hindu, 1.4% were Muslim, 0.8% were Buddhist and 3.5% had other religions.

Of those at least 15 years old, 1,680 (56.5%) people had a bachelor or higher degree, and 93 (3.1%) people had no formal qualifications. The median income was $46,300, compared with $31,800 nationally. The employment status of those at least 15 was that 1,743 (58.6%) people were employed full-time, 507 (17.1%) were part-time, and 141 (4.7%) were unemployed.

Notes

References

Suburbs of Wellington City